The Emergency Committee of Atomic Scientists (ECAS) was founded by Albert Einstein and Leó Szilárd in 1946. Its aims were to warn the public of the dangers associated with the development of nuclear weapons, promote the peaceful use of nuclear energy, and ultimately work towards world peace, which was seen as the only way that nuclear weapons would not be used again.

The Committee was established in the wake of the "Szilárd petition" (July 1945) to United States president Harry S. Truman opposing the use of the atomic bomb on moral grounds, which was signed by 68 scientists who had worked on the Manhattan Project. A majority of scientists working on the Manhattan Project did not know entirely what they were creating at the time.

The Committee only ever consisted of the eight members of the Board of Trustees, who were:
 Albert Einstein Chairman
 Harold C. Urey Vice-Chairman
 Hans Bethe
 Thorfin R. Hogness
 Philip M. Morse
 Linus Pauling
 Leó Szilárd
 Victor Weisskopf

Half the members had worked directly on the Manhattan Project and all had been indirectly involved or consulted on the production of the first atomic bomb.

Several members of the committee gave lecture tours to promote the committee's message of peace.
They produced supporting promotional materials, including one of the first films to illustrate what a full nuclear war might be like. ECAS was also very vocal in its opposition of the development of the first hydrogen bomb.

ECAS was active for four years, until 1950 when it was gradually disbanded, although most of the members continued to campaign against nuclear war, and participated in the Pugwash Conferences on Science and World Affairs.

References

External links
 Part of an interview with Linus Pauling recalling the early days of ECAS.
 Albert Einstein's 1946 telegram appeal for funds
 1947 Letter by Albert Einstein soliciting funds for the benefit of ECAS.
 George E. Rennar Papers. 1933-1972. 37.43 cubic feet. At the Labor Archives of Washington, University of Washington Libraries Special Collections. Contains ephemera on the Emergency Committee of Atomic Scientists.

Nuclear weapons policy